Musio is a social robot designed by AKA Intelligence, powered by MUSE, an AI engine for communication developed by AKA. Using learning algorithms, Musio converses with people, recognizes objects and understands people's facial expressions. Additionally, Musio has an emotional engine, which lets it express facial expressions when conversing with someone. Different sounds and facial colours are shown with animations. When multiple users are present and registered with Musio, each interaction is different. This is affected based on each person's emotional state when talking to Musio, past discussions and subjects discussed. In May 2015, Musio was first introduced to the world through the global crowdfunding site Indiegogo. AKA Intelligence raised 201% of the needed funding, resulting in a total of just over $100k.

MUSE 
MUSE is the deep learning-based AI engine for communication that powers Musio. It attempts to understand the user via textual language, oral language, gestures and facial expressions. This way, MUSE can communicate with the user as a whole. AKA Intelligence built the machine learning system on the neuroscience to interplay between structure (i.e. rule-based) and antistructure methods (i.e. statistical).

Sophy 
Sophy is Musio's companion robot that allows Musio to interact with various study materials. Using an optical LED Sensor (OID) and low-energy Bluetooth connection, Sophy can "read" information and send it to Musio. When Sophy needs to communicate to the user, a tactile feedback motor is used. This can be felt in a series of Morse-code to know exactly what the message is. A Morse-code manual is provided with Sophy.

Purpose 
Musio is a social robot for educational purposes, specifically to help people who wish to improve their English speaking abilities. With the help of a WI-FI connection, Musio can talk freely about different subjects with people. A whole range of questions can be asked, and with the use an inference abilities, Musio can understand what a person is talking about and remembering past questions. Apart from simple questions and answers, a natural conversation can be carried out. In addition, an assistant OID partner device, Sophy linked with Musio provides learning opportunities from a wide range of educational material. Two of the many abilities Musio has is "Pronunciation Checkup" and "Grammar Correction." These help with pronunciations and grammar, especially if the user is not a native English speaker.

Specification

See also 
 Artificial intelligence
 JIBO
 Manav (robot)
 Nao (robot)
 Pepper (robot)
 Sanbot (robot)
 j3l (robot)

References

External links 
 

Social robots